Jimtown is an unincorporated community on Jones Creek in Harrison County, West Virginia, United States. Jimtown lies along County Route 6.

References

Unincorporated communities in Harrison County, West Virginia
Unincorporated communities in West Virginia